The Devil's Machine, originally titled Automata, is a 2019 horror film directed by Lawrie Brewster, based on a script written by Sarah Daly. It stars Alexandra Hulme, who frequently stars in Brewster's films. It also marks the third film Brewster and Daly's Hex Studios has created with Dark Dunes Productions.

The film premiered at the 2019 Glasgow Film Festival.

Synopsis
In a remote Scottish mansion an ancient doll sits, waiting to be evaluated by an antique expert. Despite being aware of the doll's history of being cursed, Dr. Brendan Cole is unprepared for when he and his stepdaughter Rose become the focus of the curse of "The Infernal Princess". The film switches between modern day and the 1700s in order to tell the history behind the doll and its curse.

Cast
Alexandra Hulme as Talia
Erich Redman as Frederick
Jonathan Hansler as The General
Nick Ford as Officer Stille
Jamie Scott Gordon as Dr. Brendan Cole
Victoria Lucie as Rose
Stephen Kerr as Calder

Production
For the film, Brewster and Daly were inspired by a "wild mix of influences" such as Italian Gothic cinema, Mario Bava, Dario Argento, and Roger Corman. It was created over a three-year period and filming took place in Fife, Scotland, and Wales. Filming for The Devil's Machine was completed in April 2018.

Brewster has described the movie as "the most ambitious film we’ve produced". As with previous films, Brewster and Daly chose to use a different style and look than their prior film, The Black Gloves, citing a desire to "take our story to new horizons". To help with production costs, a Kickstarter campaign was launched in the spring of 2018 and by its completion in May 2018, became the site's most funded narrative film in the United Kingdom. Brewster broke a similar record with The Unkindness of Ravens, which was the highest funded British horror film on Kickstarter at the time.

Originally, the film was titled Automata, but the name was changed to The Devil's Machine around June 2019, between the limited release at film festivals and the DVD production.

References

External links
 

2019 horror films
2019 films
British horror films
Scottish films
Films shot in Scotland
Films shot in Fife
Films shot in Wales
Films directed by Lawrie Brewster
English-language Scottish films
2010s English-language films
2010s British films